Stresio is the Italian spelling of a second name used by the Balšić noble family in 15th-century Albania. It may refer to:

George Strez Balšić (Giorgio Stresio), lord of Misia
Ivan Strez Balšić (Joanne Stresio), lord of Misia
Andrea Stresio
Paolo Stresio
Bosdare Stresio, lord of Arta
Coiro Stresio
Carlo Stresio
Stenna Stresio
Helia Strescio, deacon in Spalatum

See also
Stresci

Balšić noble family